The Granby Zoo is a zoo in Granby, Quebec and is one of Quebec's major tourist attractions.

It was founded in 1953 by the mayor of Granby at the time, Pierre-Horace Boivin. There are currently more than 1,800 different animals grouped into more than 200 species. The zoo has 516,000 visitors per year and contains animals from Africa, Asia and South America. Adjacent to the zoo is the Amazoo water park. The zoo also has an amusement park called "Parc Johnny Test Collection" which is named after the Johnny Test animated television series.

Exhibits and animals

Asia 
The Asia section is home to a variety of animals. The Red Panda, Siberian Tiger, Yak, Przewalski's horse, Bactrian camel, and Japanese Macaque are a select few of the Asia section's variety of animals. They also boast a geodesic dome designed by the same architect as Montreal's famous Biosphere.

Oceania 
The Oceania section has a selection of different habitats. From the aquarium to the Australian Safari, they have many creatures from Oceania itself. To list a few: The Eastern Kangaroo, Cownose ray, Blacktip Reef Shark, Emu, Green Sea Turtle, Bennett's Wallaby, Barn Owl, Black Swan, Moon Jellyfish, and Rainbow Lorikeet. The large aquarium allows visitors to touch the stingrays. Also, during your "Australian Safari" you may encounter a Kangaroo crossing your path. You may even feed the Lorikeets. This is the most hands on section of the zoo.

South America 
Animals include Andean condors, Jaguars, Boas, and Alligators.

Gallery

References

External links
 Official website

Buildings and structures in Granby, Quebec
Zoos in Quebec
Tourist attractions in Montérégie
1953 establishments in Quebec
Zoos established in 1953